The women's heavyweight (+67 kilograms) event at the 2018 Asian Games took place on 21 August 2018 at Jakarta Convention Center Plenary Hall, Jakarta, Indonesia.

A total of fifteen competitors from fifteen countries competed in this event, limited to fighters whose body weight was more than 67 kilograms. 

Lee Da-bin of South Korea won the gold medal. She beat Cansel Deniz of Kazakhstan 27–21 in the gold medal match.

Gao Pan and Svetlana Osipova, from China and Uzbekistan respectively, finished third and won the bronze medal.

Schedule
All times are Western Indonesia Time (UTC+07:00)

Results 
Legend
DQ — Won by disqualification
W — Won by withdrawal

References

External links
Official website

Taekwondo at the 2018 Asian Games